Erhan Önal (3 September 1957 – 16 March 2021) was a Turkish footballer who played as a centre-back.

Career
Born in İzmir, Önal played for FC Bayern Munich II, FC Bayern Munich, Standard Liège, Fenerbahçe, Türkgücü München and Galatasaray.

Önal was the first Turkish immigrant in Germany to play in the Bundesliga.

In 2015, he stated that the mentality when he went on loan to Fenerbahçe was "'Erhan came, he should play, the team should come and sleep". Onal also said that the money he brought was a problem for everybody else and that the facilities were much worse than in Germany. 

While playing for Standard Liège, Önal received an offer from Bayer Leverkusen. However, the transfer never happened because Liège kept its transfer fee too high. In response to this, he left for amateur club Türkgücü München, causing some people to assume he had retired.

Despite playing for the Turkey national team, he considered himself to be Bavarian and spoke better German than Turkish.

His daughter Bige Önal is an actress.

References

External links
 

1957 births
2021 deaths
Turkish footballers
Association football defenders
Turkey international footballers
FC Bayern Munich II players
FC Bayern Munich footballers
Standard Liège players
Fenerbahçe S.K. footballers
Türkgücü München players
Galatasaray S.K. footballers
Bundesliga players
Belgian Pro League players
Süper Lig players
Turkish expatriate footballers
Turkish expatriate sportspeople in Germany
Expatriate footballers in Germany
Turkish expatriate sportspeople in Belgium
Expatriate footballers in Belgium